KWRK-LP (90.9 FM) is a radio station licensed to serve the community of Fairbanks, Alaska. The station is owned by Alaska Peace Center and airs a community radio format.

The station was assigned the KWRK-LP call letters by the Federal Communications Commission on February 14, 2014.

References

External links
 Official Website
 

WRK-LP
WRK-LP
Radio stations established in 2016
2016 establishments in Alaska
Community radio stations in the United States
Fairbanks North Star Borough, Alaska